The women's lyonnaise precision event in boules sports at the 2009 World Games took place from 21 to 22 July 2009 at the 228 Memorial Park in Kaohsiung, Taiwan.

Competition format
A total of 6 athletes entered the competition. Best four athletes from preliminary round qualifies to the final.

Results

Preliminary

Final

References

External links
 Results on IWGA website

Boules sports at the 2009 World Games